Cue sports at the 2010 Asian Games was held in Asian Games Town Gymnasium, Guangzhou, China from November 13 to 20, 2010.

Schedule

Medalists

Men

Women

Medal table

Participating nations
A total of 191 athletes from 28 nations competed in cue sports at the 2010 Asian Games:

References

Cue Sports India

External links
Official website 

 
2010
2010 Asian Games events
Asian Games
Asian Games
Cue sports in China